Parque de La Basílica is a park in the Old Centre part of Quito, Ecuador. It is located south of Parque Julio Montevelle and west of Parque La Alameda.

References

Parks in Quito